David Rufes (born November 5, 1974) is a Spanish session guitarist, vocalist and composer.

Early years and musical influences 
Rufes started playing music at the age of 7 when he had received a Spanish guitar for his birthday. He bought his first electric guitar at the age of 12 after a whole year saving money. His early childhood musical influences included The Beatles, Chuck Berry and few years later The Ramones and Guns N' Roses.

Career 
After many years playing very different styles of music, David's musical career took off with a very special way to play rock-fusion through his album Assorted Random Notes (2014). Just after releasing the album he would have the opportunity to share the stage with first class musicians like Joe Satriani, The Aristocrats (Guthrie Govan, Bryan Beller and Marco Minnemann) or Mike Keneally.

He moved to the USA where he kept developing his very own style while enjoying playing with artists like Daniel Ben Zebulon (Stevie Wonder, Richie Havens, Isaac Hayes...) or Robben Ford. During his first year in the USA he composed his album The night we met released in March 2017. A step forward in his career into a very relaxed and melodic jazz. For this record David recorded all guitars, bass and percussion and had Pau Chafer (Presuntos Implicados, Revolver) playing keys, Paul Evans (Eric Delaney, Soledad Jiménez...) playing Trumpets and Felipe Cucciardi (Lou Bennett, Michel Camilo...) playing drums.

In May 2017 David Rufes Band was invited to play in the Coral Gables Blues Festival (Florida) with Blues legends such as Juanita Dixon or Joey Gilmour)

Current David Rufes Band line-up 

In the USA:
 Rafael Figliuolo: Bass
 Sandra Marquez: Drums

In Spain:
 Carlos Ruso: Drums
 Carlos Mar: Bass

Discography 
 Toda hora llega (1999)
 Mental Tour (1999)
 Rufes (2006)
 Buenos Tiempos (2011)
 Assorted Random Notes (2014)
 The Night We Met (2017)

References 

 
 Histéricas Grabaciones – Interview. April 2014.
 Metalcry – Joe Satriani + David Rufes Trio. June 2014.
 The Borderline Music – "Una buena dosis del jazz más cálido". March 2017.
 Guitarrista: "Nuevo trabajo de David Rufes". March 2017.

External links 
 

Living people
1974 births
People from Valencia
Spanish guitarists
21st-century guitarists